Capys cupreus, the cupreous protea butterfly, is a butterfly in the family Lycaenidae. It is found in Kenya. The habitat consists of montane grassland at altitudes between 2,000 and 2,200 meters.

The larvae feed on Protea gaguedi.

References

Butterflies described in 1988
Capys (butterfly)